Mrazovac (Cyrillic: Мразовац) is a village in the municipality of Bužim, Bosnia and Herzegovina.

Demographics 
According to the 2013 census, its population was 3,653.

References

Populated places in Bužim